Dextrinocystis is a fungal genus in the family Hydnodontaceae. The genus is monotypic, containing the single white rot species Dextrinocystis capitata, found in the Gulf Coast region of the United States.

References

Fungi of North America
Monotypic Basidiomycota genera
Trechisporales
Trechisporales genera